Fate-sharing is an engineering design philosophy where related parts of a system are yoked together, so that they either fail together or not at all. Fate-sharing is an example of the end-to-end principle. The term "fate-sharing" was defined by David D. Clark in his 1988 paper "The Design Philosophy of the DARPA Internet Protocols" as follows:

The fate-sharing model suggests that it is acceptable to lose the state information associated with an entity if, at the same time, the entity itself is lost. Specifically, information about transport level synchronization is stored in the host which is attached to the net and using its communication service.

A good example of fate-sharing is the transmission of routing messages in routing protocols such as BGP, where the failure of a link or link interface automatically has the effect of terminating routing announcements through that interface, ultimately resulting in the tearing down of the state for that route at each end of the link. Similar considerations apply to TCP.

References

Internet architecture
Programming paradigms